"Solo Dance" is a song by Danish DJ and producer Martin Jensen. It was released on 4 November 2016 as digital download by Ultra Music. The song was written by Martin Jensen, Lene Dissing, Mads Dyhrberg and Peter Bjørnskov. The song is Jensen's most successful to date, reaching the top 20 in 14 European countries and having more than 650 million plays on the streaming service Spotify.

Initially, the female vocalist on the song remained anonymous. According to Jensen, "She actually was one of my friends' friend[s]. He found her on the street when she was a jazz singer. She has an incredible voice, and her live [vocal] is really really good." In November 2017, she was revealed as Danish singer Theresa Rex.

Music video
The official music video for the song was released on 27 January 2017, through Ultra Music and Martin Jensen's YouTube account. It was directed by Nicolas Tobias Følsgaard and choreographed by Tobias Ellehammer and stars dancers such as Haeni Kim, Dylan Mayoral, Jamie Telford, Sandra Brünnich, Lianne Lee May, Michel Patric Sian, Remi Black and Cilia Trappaud, who dance throughout the whole video, while Martin Jensen plays the music at the back.

It tells a very loose version of the classic "Boy meets girl, loses girl, wins girl back again" storyline.

Track listing

Charts

Weekly charts

Year-end charts

Certifications

Release history

References

2016 songs
2016 singles
Songs written by Peter Bjørnskov
Tropical house songs
Martin Jensen songs
Songs about dancing